Iron Sea and the Cavalry is Pete Francis' fifth studio album. Recorded in 2007, it was released on March 18, 2008.

Track listing
"Johnny Ocho's Lullaby"
"Armies of Angels"
"Carousel"
"Carnival"
"Shooting Star and the Ambulance"
"Case of Bad Love"
"Let It Go"
"Iron Sea and the Cavalry"
"Stowaway"
"Heavenly Boat"

References

2008 albums
Pete Francis Heimbold albums
Progressive rock albums by American artists